Ramos Saozinho Ribeiro Maxanches (born 12 April 1994), also known as Ramos Maxanches, is a football player who currently plays as goalkeeper for Timor-Leste national football team.

International career
Ramos made his senior international debut against Brunei national football team in the 2014 AFF Suzuki Cup qualification on 12 October 2014.

Ramos had an injury and is currently working as a theatre porter at West Wing Theatre, Oxford University Hospital NHS trust UK

References

External links
 

1994 births
Living people
East Timorese footballers
Timor-Leste international footballers
Association football goalkeepers
Footballers at the 2014 Asian Games
Asian Games competitors for East Timor